= S'Aranjassa =

Village in the outskirts of Palma de Mallorca, Spain

S'Aranjassa is a village in the outskirts of Palma de Mallorca, Majorca. With less than a 1000 inhabitants it is located just next to the airport. Even though it is small, it has some traditional architecture.
